The PowerBook 500 series (codenamed Blackbird, which it shared with the older Macintosh IIfx) is a range of Apple Macintosh PowerBook portable computers first introduced by Apple Computer with the 540c model on May 16, 1994. It was the first to have stereo speakers, a trackpad, and Ethernet networking built-in.

It was the first PowerBook series to use a Motorola 68LC040 CPU (simultaneous with Duo 280) and be upgradeable to the PowerPC architecture via a swap-out CPU daughter card (with the PowerPC and 68040 upgrades for sale), use 9.5-inch Dual Scan passive color/B&W displays, 16-bit stereo sound with stereo speakers, have an expansion bay, PC Card capability, two battery bays (and a ten-minute sleep/clock battery, which allowed for main batteries to be swapped out while in sleep mode), full-size keyboard with F1–F12 function keys, be able to sleep while connected to an external monitor and have a battery contact cover included on the actual batteries. It included a single serial port which could be to connect to a serial printer or a network via Apple's LocalTalk. In another first, it also included an AAUI port for connecting to Ethernet networks.

The 500 series was discontinued completely with the introduction of the ill-fated PowerBook 5300. The PowerBook 190 was the de facto successor to the 500 and continued the only 68LC040 processor offering as the low end of the PowerPC-based PowerBook family.

In a survey taken in November 2000, Insanely Great Macintosh ranked the 540c No. 2 on its list of the all-time best PowerBook models made.

History
The PowerBook 500 series was introduced on May 16, 1994, with the high-end active matrix LCD PowerBook 540c and 540, with the passive matrix 520c and 520 soon after. One of its marketing highlights was the promise of a PowerPC upgrade to its CPU and PC Card (PCMCIA) expansion. The introduction of this model came at the time of Apple's changeover to the new PowerPC chip from the 68k line of CPUs, and Apple's advertising and promise of the PowerPC was the cause of headaches to the company. The strong demand for its ground-breaking design and Apple's incorrect market prediction that customers would wait for the fully PowerPC PowerBooks resulted in shortages early on.

In August 1995 the 540 was dropped from the line, 8 MB of additional memory and the modem was offered installed from the factory, hard drive capacity was increased (from 160 and 240 to 320 and 500 MB), and the installed system upped from System 7.1.1 to 7.5. The PC Card Cage was also released, allowing Macintosh users to add PCMCIA capability to their laptops for the first time.

In 1995 Apple Japan introduced an updated version, called the 550c, with a bigger display (10.4 inches), CPU with FPU (68040), bigger hard drive, and Japanese keyboard with black case. It was only sold in Japan and never received FCC certification.

With delays for the new PowerPC PowerBook 5300, demand for the PPC upgrade mounted, and Newer Technology began to market the upgrade before Apple did, although they had produced the upgrade modules for Apple first. What's more, they offered 117 MHz versions over Apple's "100 MHz" (actually 99 MHz) offering. Soon thereafter, Newer Technology introduced a 167 MHz model that outperformed the fastest PowerBook 5300, the $6,800 5300ce, at a time when problems with that line became a real issue to Apple.

About the time Apple introduced the PowerBook 1400, Newer Technology introduced a 183 MHz upgrade with 128 KB of L2 cache that kept it ahead of the power curve in performance. Newer Technology stated they could not produce more of the 183 MHz upgrades because the supply of connectors was exhausted.

Impact on the industry 

This laptop was the first in the industry to include:
 16-bit stereo sound @ 44.1 kHz (typical was 8-bit mono @ 22 kHz);
 Trackpad
 Stereo speakers (located in upper corners of screen);
 Ethernet via AAUI (a transceiver was used to connect to either UTP or coaxial type wiring);
 Non-specialized internal expansion bay for connecting many types of devices (PDS connector in left battery bay);
 "Intelligent" NiMH batteries (that is, had on-board circuitry to monitor health of battery);
 CPU on a daughter card.

And among Apple's PowerBook line the first to have:
 68LC040 (with Duo 280), or 68040 (in Japanese model) CPU standard;
 PowerPC 603e CPU as an upgrade;
 10.4" display (550c in Japan);
 Dual Scan passive color and B+W screens;
 CPU on daughtercard (first in any Mac, facilitating PowerPC and 68040 upgrades);
 Expansion bay (PDS connector in left battery bay);
 PC Card capability (PCMCIA) via module;
 Two battery bays (and a 10-minute sleep/clock battery);
 Full-size keyboard with function keys (F1–F12);
 Sleep while connected to external monitor;
 Battery contact cover included on the batteries.

Engineering

Variations across the range
Although the 500 "Blackbird" prototypes were black, only one of the five production models was completely black; that was the 550c, sold only in Japan. The 550c differed from the four two-tone grey models in a few other key respects as well, including a larger active-matrix color screen, a combined Latin/Kana keyboard, and a full 68040 processor. The other models were all charcoal grey with darker grey trim, came with a variety of displays (active/passive matrix; color or greyscale), and used the 68LC040 processor (a low-cost variant without a math co-processor). The full-sized keyboard with 12 function keys, and 640×480 resolution display was consistent across the family.

Optional internal modem
The modem was developed with Global Village, and is a unique two-part design. The transceiver with the modem connector is installed in the back, and the modem itself is located next to the CPU daughter card.  It was a V.32 Terbo, and had a top rate of 19.2 kbit/s, but only with other V.32 Terbo modems as there was no official standard. Otherwise it would drop down to 14.4 kbit/s.
Due to a bug with the new combined printer/modem port, the driver had to be upgraded to 2.5.5, and the Chooser was replaced in the GV install.

Expansion bay
The 500 series of PowerBooks included the ability to use two batteries at the same time, allowing for 4 hours of battery life from two installed charged batteries.  However the left battery also had an internal PDS slot that allowed for custom modules to be installed.  Despite prototypes having been made, only two devices reached the market.

PCMCIA "card cage"
One is the PCMCIA module. There were three versions; RevA, RevB and RevC. The RevC is the most useful as it can take 16bit WiFi cards, allowing the possibility to get a Powerbook 5xx connected online or in the home network using a technology that was developed after the Powerbook 5xxs were discontinued by Apple. The different revisions of the PCMCIA module were released by Apple to accommodate the developing PCMCIA standard. These modules are difficult to find, and the RevC module is in particular demand because it alone works with 16-bit WiFi cards. 
PC Card (PCMCIA) cage, 16-bit, 2 Type I/II or 1 Type III cards, using a 68000 CPU to convert the PC Card protocol to PDS.

FPU co-processor
The other is the FPU co-processor, to make up for the lack of one in the PowerBook's 68LC040 CPU.
The FPU module uses a 68882 FPU co-processor made by Sonnet.

Production
In total, almost 600,000 PowerBook 500 series units were produced, compared to 300,000 PowerBook 5300 units.

Models 

The family part number is M4880, but individual models have different numbers not printed on the case

Video display support

CPU upgrades

Legacy 
Most laptops had grayscale displays, mono speakers with only 8-bit audio out, and insufficient battery life, and some had side-mounted snap-on track balls. With the built-in Ethernet (via a versatile AAUI transceiver), SCSI port (forerunner of today’s FireWire) and ADB (similar to USB), it had all the features of desktops at that time, making them the first viable desktop replacement laptops.

In popular culture
 Sandra Bullock prominently uses a PowerBook 540c (and also a PowerBook Duo 280c) in the movie The Net (1995).

 The Powerbook 540c is used by both  Antonio Banderas and Sylvester Stallone in the movie Assassins (1995 film).

Timeline

Notes

References

External links 

 
 Item 102633215 in the Computer History Museum
 Apple Technical Specifications: PowerBook
 520 Specifications
 520c Specifications
 540 Specifications
 540c Specifications
 550c Specifications
 Page of a PB 520c user with photos, screen captures, system installation, Atari emulation with Magic Mac

500
68k Macintosh computers
Computer-related introductions in 1994